Meerut Cantt (code: MUT), is a railway station in the city of Meerut. It lies on Delhi–Meerut–Saharanpur line in Delhi division of Northern Railway zone of India .

History 

The railway line between Old Delhi and Meerut was constructed in 1864. This station was established by British India government around 1865 after the Sepoy mutiny of 1857. It lies on the Delhi to Haridwar/Dehradun line.

Lines and Routes 
It lies on Delhi–Meerut–Saharanpur line that connects Delhi, Ghaziabad, Meerut, Muzaffarnagar, Saharanpur. Delhi to Meerut City is double-line and electrified while Meerut–Saharanpur section is single-electrified line. Doubling of Meerut–Saharanpur section is on full swing.

Trains 
A total of 35 trains halt at Meerut Cantt railway station. 1 train, Meerut Cantt–New Delhi–Rewari passenger (MNR) originate from Meerut Cantt.

, a major railway station, is located 4 km south.

Infrastructure 
The station was primarily built to facilitate army movement by rail by British India Government. It has dedicated infrastructure(siding and platform) for same. The station premises also has a butt welding plant with a dedicated siding that welds small segment of rails into continuous rails.

References 

Railway stations in Meerut
Transport in Meerut
Delhi railway division
Northern Railway zone
Buildings and structures in Meerut